Ain't She Sweet is an American compilation album featuring four tracks recorded in Hamburg by The Beatles in 1961 and 1962. Cover versions of Beatles and British Invasion-era songs recorded by the Swallows complete the tracklist.

History
This compilation album was issued by Atco Records in order to cash in on Beatlemania. Six songs were recorded by the Beatles in Hamburg in 1961 and 1962, with their original drummer Pete Best, as a backup band for singer and guitarist Tony Sheridan. This album's title track, sung by John Lennon, is one of two more songs that were recorded solely by the fledgling British band during these sessions produced by Bert Kaempfert. As Atlantic Records only had rights to four Sheridan/Beatle recordings by Polydor Records, they filled the rest of the album with Beatle and British Invasion cover songs by an obscure band called The Swallows. This material was released by Atco Records in mono (catalogue number 33-169) and stereo (SD 33-169) editions. The label also added additional drum overdubs to three of the four Hamburg cuts on top of the original drum tracks with some guitar and harmonica also added; "Nobody's Child" was edited down but the instrumentation not modified.

American drummer Bernard Purdie has long claimed, the first time in a 1978 interview, to have remade the recording of the drums on no less than 21 Beatles tracks. But today, there is no mention of this on the musician's official website or his autobiography, Let the Drums Speak !, released in 2014. The vast majority of sources say that it is indeed Ringo Starr who officiates behind the drums. Rather, it is likely that Purdie was the studio drummer hired by Atco Records in 1964 to add a punchier sound for the US market to the songs "Ain't She Sweet", "Take Out Some Insurance On Me, Baby" and "Sweet Georgia Brown".  It is also probable that he played on covers of Fab Four songs performed by groups of imitators with names like the Buggs, the Liverpools or the Beetles, created by unscrupulous record companies in order to take a piece of the pie. Over time, the drummer could therefore have mistakenly remembered that he embellished the original recordings.

The other four songs featuring the Beatles that were recorded in Hamburg were licensed to MGM Records and had already been released, unadulterated, on an album called The Beatles with Tony Sheridan and Their Guests in February, similarly augmented by other musician's songs. All eight songs, with four others by Tony Sheridan and The Beat Brothers, were compiled that same year by Polydor in Germany under the title The Beatles' First!, reissued in the UK in 1967 and released in the United States in 1970 under the title In the Beginning (Circa 1960).

Track listing
Songs are written by John Lennon and Paul McCartney unless otherwise indicated. Tracks 2, 3 and 4 performed by Tony Sheridan with the Beatles as a backing band. Tracks 5 to 12 performed by The Swallows.
Side one
"Ain't She Sweet" (Milton Ager, Jack Yellen) (performed by The Beatles) 
"Sweet Georgia Brown" (Ben Bernie Kenneth Casey, Maceo Pinkard)
"Take Out Some Insurance On Me, Baby" (Charles Singleton, Waldenese Hall)
"Nobody's Child" (Cy Coben, Mel Foree)
"I Wanna Be Your Man"
"She Loves You"

Side two
"How Do You Do It?" (Mitch Murray)
"Please Please Me" 
"I'll Keep You Satisfied" 
"I'm Telling You Now" (Freddie Garrity, Mitch Murray)
"I Want to Hold Your Hand" 
"From Me to You"

References

1970 compilation albums
Albums produced by Bert Kaempfert
The Beatles with Tony Sheridan albums
Atco Records compilation albums
British rock-and-roll albums